The 2016–17 BFA Senior League was the 26th season of the Bahamas top-flight football league.

First stage
Top two teams in each group plus the best third-placed team qualified for the Championship Division.

Group A

Group B

Second stage
Standings as of 20 March 2017 (before final match between Breezes and Future Stars)

Championship Division

Shield Division

References

BFA Senior League seasons
Bahamas
BFA Senior League
BFA Senior League